Turris proesignis is a species of sea snail, a marine gastropod mollusk in the family Turridae, the turrids.

Description
The length of the shell attains 42 mm; its maximum diameter: 15 mm.

The prominent row of tubercles around the middle of the whorls, the keel beneath the suture, and the broad sinus in the outer lip are the principal features of this species. The apex of the spire is broken. This makes it impossible to state with certainty the exact number of whorls, but they would probably amount to eleven or twelve. The entire surface exhibits fine flexuous lines of growth.

Distribution
This bathypelagic species occurs off Sri Lanka.

References

External links
 

proesignis
Gastropods described in 1895